Hal E. Garner, Jr. (born January 18, 1962) is a former All-American college football player for Utah State and was drafted by the Buffalo Bills in the 3rd round (63rd overall) of the 1985 NFL Draft.  Garner played linebacker for the Buffalo Bills (1985–1988, 1990–1991).

In high school, Garner played on the 1978 State Champion team for Logan High School in Logan, Utah.

In 1992, Hal Garner left pro-football following a variety of injuries and an addiction to pain medication.

External links
NFL.com

References

1962 births
Living people
People from New Iberia, Louisiana
Utah State Aggies football players
American football linebackers
Buffalo Bills players